Jhon Jairo Charría Escobar (born May 14, 1978) is a Colombian football midfielder who plays for Delfines del Este FC in the Liga Dominicana de Fútbol. Charría is known for his ability to score mid range goals with either foot.

Although he is a midfielder he has been one of the goalscorers of the Copa Mustang.

References

External links
GolGolGol stats

1978 births
Living people
Sportspeople from Valle del Cauca Department
Colombian footballers
Categoría Primera A players
América de Cali footballers
Deportivo Pasto footballers
Deportes Tolima footballers
Atlético Nacional footballers
Deportivo Pereira footballers
Deportivo Cali footballers
Boyacá Chicó F.C. footballers
Atlético Bucaramanga footballers
Universitario Popayán footballers
Colombian expatriate footballers
Expatriate footballers in the Dominican Republic
Association football midfielders
Colombian expatriate sportspeople in the Dominican Republic
Liga Dominicana de Fútbol players